Viktor Melkhiorovich Kress (born 16 November 1948) is a Russian politician. He is best known for serving five terms as governor of Tomsk Oblast, Russia from 1991 to 2012.

Biography

Kress was born into a peasant family with five brothers and a sister. Both of his parents were ethnic Germans. During his education he also worked on the farm at the village of Yashkino in Kemerovo Oblast.

Kress graduated from Novosibirsk Agricultural Institute in 1971 as an agricultural economist and worked as an agronomist in Siberia eventually becoming head of the Rodina Sovkhoz near Tomsk. In 1987, he rose to the position of First Secretary of the CPSU committee of Pervomayskoye rayon, Tomsk Oblast. In 1990, Kress was elected and served as speaker of the Tomsk Oblast Soviet. In 1991, after the Dissolution of the Soviet Union, President Boris Yeltsin appointed him as governor of Tomsk Oblast. Kress won re-election by popular vote three times, in 1995, 1999 and 2003. In 2007, President Vladimir Putin, who had ended the direct election of governors, nominated him for a fifth term, which he won by a vote of the Regional Duma. On March 17, 2012, Kress resigned as governor.

On May 17, 2012, Kress' successor, Governor Sergey Zhvachkin, appointed him to the Federation Council as the representative of Tomsk Oblast. He serves as the Deputy Chairman of the Committee on Science, Education, Culture and Information Policy.

Kress became a member of the United Russia party in 2004.

Sanctions
In December 2022 the EU sanctioned Viktor Kress in relation to the 2022 Russian invasion of Ukraine.

Books

Kress has also authored five books
Difficult Times of Russia: A Look at the Provinces (1998)
Tomsk Oblast: Today and Tomorrow (1999)
Tomsk Oblast at the Crossroads of the Centuries (1999)
Tomsk Oblast: The Start of the 21st Century (2002)
Direct Answers to Complex Questions (2003)

Personal life

Kress is married to Lyudmila Kress and has two children, His daughter Elena is a cardiologist and his son Vyacheslav is judge at the Seventh appellant arbriage court. He has four grandchildren.

Honours and awards

Order of Merit for the Fatherland;
3rd class (16 November 2008) - for his great personal contribution to the socio-economic development of the field and many years of diligent work
4th class (13 November 1998) - for services to the state and a major contribution to socio-economic development of the region
Order of the Badge of Honour
Medal "For Labour Valour"
Diploma of the President of the Russian Federation (12 December 2008) - for active participation in the drafting of the Constitution and a great contribution to the democratic foundations of the Russian Federation
Order of Holy Prince Daniel of Moscow, 1st class (Russian Orthodox Church, 2002)
Breastplate of the Foreign Ministry of Russia "for contribution to international cooperation" (2008) - for active international activity for the development of international co-operation of Tomsk region with the European Union, Southeast Asia, Israel, United States
Honorary Citizen of the Tomsk region (2008) - for outstanding contribution to the objectives of socio-economic development of the Tomsk region, many years of fruitful work
Honorary citizen of Tomsk (2004)
Badge "For Services to the Tomsk region" (26 February 2004) - for his great personal contribution to the socio-economic development, successful management of the area during the period of political and economic reforms, stability, peace and harmony on earth
Badge of Honour "for his services in promoting the Olympic Movement in Russia" (2004, R & D)
Order of St. Sergius, 1st class (2008, Russian Orthodox Church)
Order of Merit of the Federal Republic of Germany - November 23, 2010

References

External links
Governor's Official Page

1948 births
Living people
People from Kostroma Oblast
Heads of the federal subjects of Russia of German descent
Communist Party of the Soviet Union members
United Russia politicians
21st-century Russian politicians
Governors of Tomsk Oblast
Members of the Federation Council of Russia (1994–1996)
Members of the Federation Council of Russia (1996–2000)
Members of the Federation Council of Russia (after 2000)
Recipients of the Order "For Merit to the Fatherland", 3rd class
Recipients of the Order of Holy Prince Daniel of Moscow
Knights Commander of the Order of Merit of the Federal Republic of Germany